Parnell Hall (October 31, 1944 – December 15, 2020) was a mystery writer. His works include the Puzzle Lady and the Stanley Hastings series, as well as the screenplay to the 1984 cult classic C.H.U.D. He collaborated with Manny Nosowsky for crossword puzzles and with Will Shortz for sudoku puzzles incorporated in Puzzle Lady stories.

He also wrote under the pen name J.P. Hailey, under which he wrote the Steve Winslow series. He co-authored "Smooth Operator" with Stuart Woods.

In 2019, Malice Domestic gave him an award for Lifetime Achievement.

Bibliography

The Stanley Hastings Mysteries
Detective (1987)
Murder (1988)
Favor (1988)
Strangler (1989)
Client (1990)
Juror (1990)
Shot (1991)
Actor (1993)
Blackmail (1994)
Movie (1995)
Trial (1996)
Scam (1997)
Suspense (1998)
Cozy (2001)
Manslaughter (2002)
Hitman (2007)
Caper (2010)
Stakeout (2013)
Safari (2014)
A Fool for a Client (2015)

The Puzzle Lady Mysteries
A Clue for the Puzzle Lady (1999)
Last Puzzle & Testament (2000)
Puzzled to Death (2001)
A Puzzle in a Pear Tree (2002)
With This Puzzle, I Thee Kill (2003)
And a Puzzle to Die On (2004)
Stalking the Puzzle Lady (2005)
You Have the Right to Remain Puzzled (2006)
The Sudoku Puzzle Murders (2008)
Dead Man’s Puzzle (2009)
The Puzzle Lady vs. The Sudoku Lady (2010)
The KenKen Killings (2011)
$10,000 in Small Unmarked Puzzles (2012)
Arsenic and Old Puzzles (2013)
NYPD Puzzle (2014)
Puzzled Indemnity (2015)
Presumed Puzzled (2016)
A Puzzle to Be Named Later (2017)
The Purloined Puzzle (2018)
Lights! Camera! Puzzles! (2019)

Teddy Fay novels (with Stuart Woods)
All these novels also feature Woods' popular character Stone Barrington.

Smooth Operator (2016)
The Money Shot (2018)
Skin Game (2019)
Bombshell (June 2, 2020)

Herbie Fisher novels (with Stuart Woods) 
Also features Stone Barrington.

Barely Legal (2017)

As J.P. Hailey

The Steve Winslow Courtroom Dramas

The Baxter Trust (1988)
The Anonymous Client (1989)
The Underground Man (1990)
The Naked Typist (1990)
The Wrong Gun (1992)
The Innocent Woman (2011)

Thriller

Chasing Jack (2020)

Anthologies and collections

Filmography 
Cannibalistic Humanoid Underground Dwellers (C.H.U.D) – 1984 – screenplay

References

Cannibalistic Humanoid Underground Dwellers (C.H.U.D) – https://m.imdb.com/title/tt0087015/

External links
 
 
 Parnell Hall on MysteryNet
 

20th-century American novelists
21st-century American novelists
American male novelists
American mystery writers
People from Culver City, California
Living people
1944 births
American male short story writers
20th-century American short story writers
21st-century American short story writers
20th-century American male writers
21st-century American male writers
Novelists from California